Conor O'Clery is an Irish journalist and writer.

Background

Born in Belfast, Conor O'Clery graduated from Queen's University Belfast in 1972. He was deputy editor of The Gown, the QUB student newspaper.

Career

O'Clery worked for The Irish Times for over 30 years in various positions, including news editor and foreign correspondent based in London, Moscow, Washington, D.C., Beijing and New York City.

He wrote for The New Republic from Moscow, contributed columns to Newsweek International, and has been a frequent commentator on broadcast channels BBC, NPR and CNN.

O'Clery won several awards, including Journalist of the Year, twice, in Ireland: first, in 1987, for his reporting of the Soviet Union, and secondly, in 2002, for reporting the 9/11 attacks on the World Trade Center in New York, which he witnessed from his office three blocks away.

O'Clery has written a number of books.

He lives in Dublin with his Russian-born Armenian wife, Zhanna. His book, The Shoemaker and his Daughter, tells the story of Zhanna's family, an ordinary Soviet family, from World War 1 to the fall of the Soviet Union and won the 2020 Michel Déon Prize for non-fiction.

Bibliography
 The Shoemaker and his Daughter, August 2018 
 The Star Man, 2016
 Moscow, December 25, 1991: The Last Day of the Soviet Union, 2011
 May You Live in Interesting Times, 2008
 The Billionaire Who Wasn't: How Chuck Feeney Secretly Made and Gave Away a Fortune, 2007
 Panic at the Bank: How John Rusnak Lost AIB $700 Million (co-authored with Siobhan Creaton), 2002
 Ireland in Quotes: A History of the Twentieth Century, 1999
 The Greening of the White House, 1997
 Daring Diplomacy: Clinton's Secret Search for Peace in Ireland, 1997
 America, A Place Called Hope?, 1993
 Melting Snow: An Irishman in Moscow, 1991
 Phrases Make History Here: Century of Irish Political Quotations, 1886-1986

References

External links

Year of birth missing (living people)
Living people
Alumni of Queen's University Belfast
Irish newspaper editors
Journalists from Belfast
Journalists from Dublin (city)
The Irish Times people
Male non-fiction writers from Northern Ireland
21st-century writers from Northern Ireland